Horacio Aldo Humoller Hang (born 12 December 1966 in Humboldt, Santa Fe) is a retired Argentine football defender who played for several clubs in Argentina and Mexico, including Unión de Santa Fe and Deportivo Toluca F.C.

External links
 Argentine Primera Statistics  
 
 

1966 births
Living people
People from Las Colonias Department
Argentine footballers
Association football defenders
Liga MX players
Unión de Santa Fe footballers
Deportivo Toluca F.C. players
Atlante F.C. footballers
Talleres de Córdoba footballers
Argentine expatriate footballers
Expatriate footballers in Mexico
Argentine people of German descent
Sportspeople from Santa Fe Province